Lawrence Berry "Tee" Mitchell (May 2, 1916 – November 3, 1970) was an American Negro league pitcher in the 1930s.

A native of Mill, Georgia, Mitchell played for the Indianapolis ABCs in 1939. He died in Atlanta, Georgia in 1970 at age 54.

References

External links
 and Seamheads

1916 births
1970 deaths
Atlanta Black Crackers players
Baseball pitchers
Baseball players from Georgia (U.S. state)
20th-century African-American sportspeople